Trevor Blackwell (born 4 November 1969, in Canada) is an American computer programmer, engineer and entrepreneur based in Silicon Valley.

Blackwell is a developer of humanoid robots. Dr. Blackwell is the founder and former CEO of Anybots and a partner at Y Combinator.

Life and career 

Blackwell grew up in Saskatoon, Saskatchewan, Canada. Blackwell studied engineering at Carleton University and received a Bachelor of Engineering in 1992, then studied Computer Science at Harvard University and received a PhD in 1998. His dissertation applied randomized methods to analyzing the performance of networks and compilers.

During graduate school Blackwell joined Viaweb for which he wrote the image rendering, order processing and statistics software. The company was acquired by Yahoo in 1998, and Blackwell moved to Silicon Valley to lead the Yahoo Store development group.

He founded Anybots in 2001 to build teleoperated humanoid robots. In 2006, Anybots announced a humanoid robot that walks and balances like people do, without depending on large feet for stability.

As side projects, he has built two other balancing vehicles: a two-wheeled balancing scooter similar to the Segway but with different steering, and the self-balancing Eunicycle. Several hobbyists have built vehicles based on the open design of the machine.

He co-founded Y Combinator in 2005.

References

External links 

 
 Biography
 Dexter Walks
 The Robots Among Us

1969 births
Canadian computer programmers
Harvard University alumni
Carleton University alumni
Living people
Canadian roboticists
Canadian computer scientists
American technology company founders
Canadian company founders
Canadian chief executives
People from Saskatoon
Businesspeople from Saskatchewan
Canadian engineers
Yahoo! employees
American roboticists
Y Combinator people